The Golden Rule Department Store, located at 201-203 Main St. in Lemmon, South Dakota, is a building built in 1908.  It has also been known as the J.C. Elliot Building.  The building was listed on the National Register of Historic Places in 1976.

It was built by John Patterson just a year after Lemmon was founded.  It is a two-story four-bay Romanesque Revival-style building.

See also
Golden Rule Stores, a predecessor of J.C. Penney's

References

Commercial buildings on the National Register of Historic Places in South Dakota
Romanesque Revival architecture in South Dakota
Commercial buildings completed in 1908
Perkins County, South Dakota